Quinn Remar Early (born April 13, 1965) is a former professional American football player who was selected by the San Diego Chargers in the third round of the 1988 NFL Draft. A 6'0", . wide receiver from the University of Iowa, Early played in 12 NFL seasons from 1988 to 1999. 

Quinn Early played high school football at Great Neck South High School. He currently teaches Choy Li Fut Kung Fu in San Diego at White Dragon Martial Arts  and has written and published in Inside Kung Fu magazine.

In January 2013, Early was one of several professionals named as part of a mentoring program to assist with former #1 overall draft pick JaMarcus Russell's potential comeback to the NFL.

References

External links
 https://web.archive.org/web/20100611102308/http://www.quick-feet.com/

1965 births
Living people
American football wide receivers
Iowa Hawkeyes football players
San Diego Chargers players
New Orleans Saints players
Buffalo Bills players
New York Jets players
People from West Hempstead, New York